The women's 4×100 metres relay at the 2004 Summer Olympics as part of the athletics program was held at the Athens Olympic Stadium from August 26 to 27. The sixteen teams competed in a two-heat qualifying round in which the first three teams from each heat, together with the next two fastest teams, were given a place in the final race.

The final started off quickly with an early lead from Jamaica, before the U.S. team, led by Angela Williams, made a tactical move to pass their Jamaican rivals towards the exchange zone. Marion Jones ran the second leg confidently to put the Americans a more decent lead, until she finally approached the 100 metres silver medalist Lauryn Williams to do the handoff. By the time Williams was about to move off her mark on the third leg, Jones lunged out of breath with baton and desperately tried to catch her at the exchange zone that never happened, costing the Americans' chances for the Olympic medal. As the race continued without the U.S. team, the Jamaicans, anchored by 200 metres champion Veronica Campbell, scorched their way down the home stretch to an effortless victory in 41.73 seconds. They were soon followed by Russia taking the silver, and the French quartet rounding out the medal podium with the bronze.

Records
, the existing World and Olympic records were as follows.

No new records were set during the competition.

Qualification
The qualification period for athletics was 1 January 2003 to 9 August 2004. A National Olympic Committee (NOC) could enter one qualified relay team per relay event, with a maximum of six athletes. For this event, an NOC would be invited to participate with a relay team if the average of the team's two best times, obtained in IAAF-sanctioned meetings or tournaments, would be among the best sixteen, at the end of this period.

Schedule
All times are Greece Standard Time (UTC+2)

Results

Round 1
Qualification rule: The first three teams in each heat (Q) plus the next two fastest overall (q) moved on to the final.

Heat 1

Heat 2

Final

References

External links
 IAAF Athens 2004 Olympic Coverage

W
Relay foot races at the Olympics
2004 in women's athletics
Women's events at the 2004 Summer Olympics